Nina Rajarani, MBE, is a South Asian dancer and choreographer and winner of The Place Prize 2006. She runs a dance school based in Harrow, Middlesex, and is Artistic Director of Srishti - Nina Rajarani Dance Creations, a male-dominated touring dance company.

Nina Rajarani was awarded the Diploma in Bharatanatyam from the Bharatiya Vidya Bhavan in 1986 and in 1987 she staged her Arangetram. Rajarani has toured as a performer in the UK, Europe, Singapore, Malaysia and Australia.

Rajarani won the Place Prize, Europe's largest choreographic competition, in the autumn of 2006. Rajarani was chosen from 20 finalists and 204 entries overall.  The winning piece, QUICK!, is inspired by the fast-paced world of city traders. Popular with audiences, QUICK! remains in the touring repertory.

Nina Rajarani was awarded an MBE in the Queen’s 2009 Birthday Honours, in recognition of her services to South Asian Dance. The award was announced on 13 June 2009.

Rajarani has a school of dance established in 1991 and based at the Harrow Arts Centre in Middlesex. Rajarani is currently the Secretary of the South Asian Dance Faculty of the ISTD. She is also an Associate Artist of Akademi.

After a three-year hiatus from performance, Rajarani returned to the stage in March 2010 in the touring company showcase These Are A few Of My Favourite Things.

References

External links
The Place Prize website
Review of Quick! in The Times
Review of Quick! in The Guardian
News story on Nina Rajarani being awarded the MBE
List of people awarded the MBE in the Birthday Honours list 2009 in The Independent
Srishti website

Living people
Members of the Order of the British Empire
Indian female dancers
People from New Delhi
Year of birth missing (living people)
Dancers from Delhi